Ships with Wings is a 1941 British war film directed by Sergei Nolbandov and starring John Clements, Leslie Banks and Jane Baxter. The film is set during the Battle of Greece (1940-1941). It depicts military aviation.

Plot
During the Second World War, pilot Lieutenant Dick Stacey is expelled from the British Fleet Air Arm for imprudence, but later has the opportunity to redeem himself when he takes part in the fight against the Germans in Greece.

Cast

 John Clements - Lieutenant Dick Stacey 
 Leslie Banks - Vice Admiral David Wetherby 
 Jane Baxter - Celia Wetherby 
 Ann Todd - Kay Gordon 
 Basil Sydney - Captain Bill Fairfax 
 Edward Chapman - 'Papa' Papadopoulos 
 Hugh Williams - Wagner 
 Frank Pettingell - Fields
 Michael Wilding - Lieutenant David Grant 
 Michael Rennie - Lt Maxwell 
 Cecil Parker - German Air Marshal 
 John Stuart - Commander Hood 
 Morland Graham - CPO Marsden 
 Charles Victor - MacDermott 
 Hugh Burden - Sub Lieutenant  Mickey Wetherby 
 Frank Cellier - General Baradino Scarappa 
 Betty Marsden - Jean 
 John Laurie - Lieutenant-Commander  Reid 
 George Merritt - Surgeon Commander 
 Charles Sturat - Von Rittau

Production
The film was made by Ealing Studios, but filmed at Fountain Studios in Wembley Park, north-west London.

Release
The film premiered in November 1941 and went on general release in January 1942. It was a commercial success and was the second most popular film in British cinemas that month behind It Started with Eve. Ark Royal portrays the fictional HMS Invincible - a name not used for a Royal Navy aircraft carrier until the 1970s. The most recent ship named HMS Invincible until then was a battlecruiser sunk at the Battle of Jutland in 1916.

Critical reception
The film received an overwhelmingly positive reception from the popular press on its release. However, it came under attack from a number of intellectuals for what they considered its lack of realism while the Prime Minister Winston Churchill objected because of the large number of British casualties shown in the film which he considered bad for morale. The producer Michael Balcon was disturbed by these criticisms and commenced a shift in Ealing’s production away from such films towards what were considered more realistic portrayals in an attempt to counter this perceived lack of authenticity. However, except for Dead of Night, Ealing's films for the remainder of the war failed to enjoy the same commercial success as the earlier "unrealistic" war films and were eclipsed at the box office by the Gainsborough melodramas.

References

Bibliography
 Aldgate, Anthony & Richards, Jeffrey. Britain Can Take It: British Cinema in the Second World War. I.B. Tauris, 2007.

External links

 - Discussion of the special effects techniques used in the film.

1941 films
1941 war films
British aviation films
British war films
1940s English-language films
World War II aviation films
World War II films made in wartime
Ealing Studios films
Films directed by Sergei Nolbandov
Films produced by Michael Balcon
British black-and-white films
Films with screenplays by Patrick Kirwan
Films set in Greece
Battle of Greece
Films shot in London
1940s British films